Therapy is a 1989 album by Loudon Wainwright III.  It followed a three-year hiatus, during which Wainwright moved from England (where he had recorded his previous two albums) back to the USA. Compared with those two, Therapy was not well received, but outstanding tracks have subsequently appeared on live albums (e.g. "Thanksgiving" on Career Moves).

Track listing
All tracks composed by Loudon Wainwright III

"Therapy"  – 4:24
"Bill of Goods"  – 3:20
"T.S.D.H.A.V."  – 2:09
"Harry's Wall"  – 5:22
"Aphrodisiac"  – 3:47
"Fly Paper"  – 3:42
"Nice Guys"  – 3:03
"Thanksgiving"  – 5:39
"Your Father's Car"  – 2:23
"Me & All The Other Mothers"  – 3:04
"You Don't Want to Know"  – 3:46
"Mind Read (It Belonged to You)" – 2:47
"This Year"  – 3:04

This Song Don't Have A Video
The only single from Therapy, "T.S.D.H.A.V.", actually did have one, featuring Wainwright singing the song in an easy chair; he gets up from the chair for a moment to answer the telephone (a PLEASE STAND BY graphic appears on the screen). It still airs occasionally on VH-1 Classic.

A live version of "T.S.D.H.A.V." can be found on the b-side of Wainwright's one-off single "If Jesse Don't Like It", which was also recorded before an audience.

Personnel
Loudon Wainwright III - guitar, vocals
Richard Thompson - guitar, mandolin
Arran Ahmun - drums, percussion
B.J. Cole - pedal steel
Alan Dunn - piano, accordion
Bob Loveday - fiddle
Ian Maidman - bass
Ruari McFarlane - bass
Chaim Tannenbaum - banjo, harmonica, tenor saxophone
Linda Taylor - vocals
Olly Blanchflower - double bass
Simon Limbrick - marimba
Cathi Ogden - vocals

Release history
LP: Silvertone  1203-1-J
LP: Silvertone  ORE LP 500
CD: Silvertone  ORE CD 500

References

Loudon Wainwright III albums
1989 albums